Costa-Gavras (short for Konstantinos Gavras; ; born 12 February 1933) is a Greek-French film director, screenwriter, and producer who lives and works in France. He is known for films with political and social themes, such as the political thriller Z (1969), for which he won an Academy Award for Best Foreign Language Film, and Missing (1982), for which he won the Palme d'Or and an Academy Award for Best Adapted Screenplay. Most of his films have been made in French; however, six of them were made in English.

His film Z was the first film, and one of the few, to be nominated for both the Best Picture and Best Foreign Language Film.

Early life
Costa-Gavras was born in Loutra Iraias, Arcadia. His family spent the Second World War in a village in the Peloponnese, and moved to Athens after the war. His father had been a member of the Pro-Soviet branch of the Greek Resistance, and was imprisoned during the Greek Civil War. His father's Communist Party membership made it impossible for Costa-Gavras to attend university in Greece or to be granted a visa to the United States, so after high school he settled in France, where he began studying literature at the Sorbonne in 1951.

Early career
In 1956, he left his university studies to study film at the French national film school, IDHEC. After film school, he apprenticed under Yves Allégret, and became an assistant director for Jean Giono and René Clair. After several further positions as first assistant director, he directed his first feature film, Compartiment Tueurs, in 1965.

Selected films
His 1967 film Shock Troops (Un homme de trop) was entered into the 5th Moscow International Film Festival.

In Z (1969), an investigating judge, played by Jean-Louis Trintignant, tries to uncover the truth about the murder of a prominent leftist politician, played by Yves Montand, while government officials and the military attempt to cover up their roles. The film is a fictionalised account of the events surrounding the assassination of Greek politician Grigoris Lambrakis in 1963. It had additional resonance because, at the time of its release, Greece had been ruled for two years by the "Regime of the Colonels". Z won the Oscar for Best Foreign Language Film. Costa-Gavras and co-writer Jorge Semprún won an Edgar Award from the Mystery Writers of America for Best Film Screenplay.

L'Aveu (The Confession, 1970) follows the path of Artur London, a Czechoslovakian communist minister falsely arrested and tried for treason and espionage in the Slánský 'show trial' in 1952.

State of Siege (1972) takes place in Uruguay under the civic-military dictatorship of Uruguay in the early 1970s. In a plot loosely based on the case of US police official and alleged torture expert Dan Mitrione, an American embassy official (played by Yves Montand) is kidnapped by the Tupamaros, a radical leftist urban guerilla group, which interrogates him in order to reveal the details of secret American support for repressive regimes in Latin America.

Missing, originally released in 1982 and based on the book The Execution Of Charles Horman, concerns an American journalist, Charles Horman (played by John Shea in the film), who disappeared in the 1973 coup d'état led by General Augusto Pinochet in Chile. Horman's father, played by Jack Lemmon, and wife, played by Sissy Spacek, search in vain to determine his fate. Nathaniel Davis, US ambassador to Chile from 1971–1973, a version of whose character had been portrayed in the movie (under a different name), filed a US$150 million libel suit, Davis v. Costa-Gavras, 619 F. Supp. 1372 (1985), against the studio and the director, which was eventually dismissed. The film won an Oscar for Best Screenplay Adaptation and the Palme d'Or at the Cannes Film Festival. 

Betrayed (1988), roughly based upon the terrorist activities of American neo-Nazi and white supremacist Robert Mathews and his group The Order.

In Music Box (1989), a respected Hungarian immigrant (Armin Mueller-Stahl) is accused of having commanded an Anti-Semitic death squad during World War II. His daughter, a Chicago defence attorney played by Jessica Lange, agrees to defend him at his denaturalization hearing. The film is inspired by the arrest and trial of Ukrainian immigrant John Demjanjuk and screenwriter Joe Eszterhas' realisation that his father had been a member of the Hungarian Arrow Cross Party. The film won the Golden Bear at the 40th Berlin International Film Festival.

La Petite Apocalypse (1993) was entered into the 43rd Berlin International Film Festival. Amen. (2003), was based in part on the highly controversial 1963 play, Der Stellvertreter. Ein christliches Trauerspiel (The Deputy, a Christian Tragedy), by Rolf Hochhuth. The film plot alleges that Pope Pius XII was aware of the plight of the Jews in Nazi concentration camps during World War II, but failed to take public action to publicise or condemn the Holocaust. Gavras won César Award for Best Writing for this film.

He was president of the Cinémathèque Française from 1982 to 1987, and again since 2007.

Political-commercial film

Costa-Gavras is known for merging controversial political issues with the entertainment value of commercial cinema. Law and justice, oppression, legal/illegal violence, and torture are common subjects in his work, especially relevant to his earlier films. Costa-Gavras is an expert of the “statement” picture. In most cases, the targets of Costa-Gavras's work have been right wing or far right movements and regimes, including the Greek   military in Z, and right-wing dictatorships that ruled much of Latin America during the height of the Cold War, as in State of Siege and Missing.

In a broader sense, this emphasis continues with Amen. given its focus on the conservative leadership of the Catholic Church during the 1940s. In this political context, L'Aveu (The Confession) provides the exception, dealing as it does with oppression on the part of a Communist regime during the Stalinist period.

Issues and style
Costa-Gavras has brought attention to international issues, some urgent, others merely problematic, and he has done this in the tradition of cinematic story-telling. Z (1969), one of his most well-known works, is an account of the undermining in the 1960s of democratic government in Greece, his homeland and place of birth. The format, however, is a mystery-thriller combination that transforms an uncomfortable history into a fast-paced story. This is a clear example of how he pours politics into plot, "bringing epic conflicts into the sort of personal conflicts we are accustomed to seeing on screen."

His accounts of corruption propagated, in their essence, by European and American powers (Z, State of Siege and Missing) highlight problems buried deep in the structures of these societies, problems which he deems not everyone is comfortable addressing. The approach he adopted in L'Aveu also "subtly invited the audience to a critical look focused on structural issues, delving this time into the opposite Communist bloc."

Until 2019's Adults in the Room, Costa-Gavras had never worked in Greece or made a film in the Greek language.

Influences
When Costa-Gavras asked about some of his biggest cinematic influences, he replied: 

According to his son Romain Gavras, Costa-Gavras used to show all of Tarkovsky's films to him at a young age.

Legacy and Influence
Costa-Gavras films have been a significant influence on Political cinema. Wade Major of the Directors Guild of America mentioned that, "With films like Z and Missing, Costa-Gavras almost single-handedly created the modern political thriller".

He has influenced directors such as Oliver Stone, William Friedkin and Steven Soderbergh. Stone mentioned that Costa-Gavras "was certainly one of my earliest role models,...I was a film student at NYU when Z came out, which we studied. Costa actually came over with Yves Montand for a screening and was such a hero to us. He was in the tradition of Gillo Pontecorvo's The Battle of Algiers and was the man in that moment... it was a European moment."

The American filmmaker William Friedkin listed Z as one of his favorite films and mentioned the film's influence on him when directing his film The French Connection: "After I saw Z, I realized how I could shoot The French Connection. Because he [Costa-Gavras] shot 'Z' like a documentary. It was a fiction film but it was made like it was actually happening. Like the camera didn't know what was gonna happen next. And that is an induced technique. It looks like he happened upon the scene and captured what was going on as you do in a documentary. My first films were documentaries too. So I understood what he was doing but I never thought you could do that in a feature at that time until I saw Z."

The American filmmaker Steven Soderbergh listed Z as an inspiration on his film Traffic and even stated that he "wanted to make it like [Costa-Gavras's] Z". In 2020, Costa Gavras wrote the preface to the book Opération Condor, by French writer and journalist Pablo Daniel Magee.

Accolades

Costa-Gavras's debut film, Compartiment Tueurs, won National Board of Review Award for Best Foreign Language Film and was nominated for the Edgar Award for Best Screenplay in 1967.

The film Z was the first film to be nominated for both the Best Picture and Best Foreign Language Film. It won the latter, as well as the Jury Prize at the Cannes Film Festival, and the Golden Globe Award for Best Foreign Film. Z was also the first foreign-language film to win the Best Film award from the New York Film Critics Circle. Gavras won the Best Director award as well.

Costa-Gavras has received an honorary doctorate from the Film School of the Aristotle University in 2013.

He was interviewed extensively by The Times cultural correspondent Melinda Camber Porter and was featured prominently in her book Through Parisian Eyes: Reflections on Contemporary French Arts and Culture (1993, Da Capo Press).

Costa-Gavras received the Magritte Honorary Award in 2013. He was the first filmmaker to receive the Catalonia International Prize (2017).

Personal life
His daughter Julie Gavras and his sons Romain Gavras and Alexandre Gavras are also filmmakers. He is the first cousin of filmmaker Penelope Spheeris and musicians Jimmie Spheeris and Chris Spheeris. He is a distant relative of actor Jordan Gavaris.

In 2009, Costa-Gavras signed a petition in support of film director Roman Polanski, calling for his release after Polanski was arrested in Switzerland in relation to his 1977 charge for drugging and raping a 13-year-old girl.

Filmography

Films

References

Further reading

External links

 
 

1933 births
Living people
Best Adapted Screenplay Academy Award winners
Best Screenplay BAFTA Award winners
Cannes Film Festival Award for Best Director winners
European Film Awards winners (people)
Directors of Best Foreign Language Film Academy Award winners
Directors of Palme d'Or winners
Directors of Golden Bear winners
Edgar Award winners
English-language film directors
French film directors
French people of Greek descent
Greek communists
Greek film directors
Greek emigrants to France
Magritte Award winners
Writers Guild of America Award winners
Officers of the Ordre national du Mérite
Commandeurs of the Légion d'honneur
People from Iraia